Nosaka is a Japanese surname. Notable people with the surname include:

Akiyuki Nosaka (1930–2015), Japanese novelist, singer, lyricist, and former member of the House of Councillors
Keiko Nosaka (born 1938), prominent Japanese koto player, specializing in contemporary music
Koken Nosaka (1924–2004), Japanese politician
Sanzō Nosaka (1892–1993), the co-founder of the Japanese Communist Party

See also
Nosaka, Chiba, town located in Sōsa District, Chiba Prefecture, Japan

Japanese-language surnames